Samuel Long or Sam Long may refer to:

Samuel Long (MP) (1746–1807), British politician
Samuel Long (Jamaica) (fl. 1671–1673), Jamaican politician
Sam Long (baseball) (born 1995), American baseball pitcher
Sam Long (footballer, born 1995), English football defender
Sam Long (footballer, born 2002), Scottish football goalkeeper